Beligammana Raja Maha Vihara (also known as Beligammana Pothgul Vihara) is a Buddhist temple situated in Mawanella, Kegalle District, Sri Lanka.

Constructed in the early part of the 19th century, this temple is presently declared as an archaeological protected monument by the Department of Archaeology. The designation was declared on 7 December 2001 under the government Gazette number 1214.

See also
Utuwankande Sura Saradiel

References

Buddhist temples in Kegalle District
Archaeological protected monuments in Kegalle District